Jinfeng District is one of three urban districts of the prefecture-level city of Yinchuan, the capital of Ningxia Hui Autonomous Region, Northwest China.

Characteristics

Jinfeng District has developed industry in recent years. Industry in the district is divided into the New Material Industrial Park, the New High-Tech Industrial Park, the Specialized Medicine Industrial Park, and the Comprehensive Industrial Park. The district forms one of the cores of Yinchuan's industrial economy. The district government is located on East Xinxia Road, and the district's postal code is 750011. In 2006, Yinchuan's city-level government moved from Xingqing District to Jinfeng District, so Jinfeng District will become the administrative center of Yinchuan in the future.

Administrative divisions
Jinfeng District has 5 subdistricts and 2 townships.
5 subdistricts
 Changchengzhonglu
 Shanghaixilu
 Beijingzhonglu
 Huanghe Donglu
 Mancheng Beijie

2 towns
 Fengdeng
 Liangtian

References

County-level divisions of Ningxia
Yinchuan